Pipestem (also Jordans Chapel or Pipe Stem) is an unincorporated community in Summers County, West Virginia, United States.  It lies along West Virginia Route 20 to the south-southwest of the city of Hinton, the county seat of Summers County.   Its elevation is 2,382 feet (726 m).  It has a post office with the ZIP code 25979. It has a population of 764 people.

References

Unincorporated communities in Summers County, West Virginia
Unincorporated communities in West Virginia